"Love Scars" is a song by American rapper Trippie Redd, first released through SoundCloud on November 24, 2016. It gained traction in 2017, becoming one of his most popular songs, and appears on his debut commercial mixtape A Love Letter to You (2017).

Background
According to Trippie Redd, the song was made in Columbus, Ohio and he recorded it in one take in a dark room. He originally created a song called "Long Way Home From Mars / Love Scars", but he separated it into two songs. The song also samples music from the video game Metroid Prime.

The song began garnering attention in early 2017. The success of the song helped Redd reach fame as a rapper.

Charts

Certifications

References

2016 debut singles
2016 songs
Trippie Redd songs
Songs written by Trippie Redd